Beimen District is a coastal district of about 10,191 residents in Tainan, Taiwan.

History
After the handover of Taiwan from Japan to the Republic of China in 1945, Beimen was organized as a rural township of Tainan County. On 25 December 2010, Tainan County merged with Tainan City and Beimen was upgraded to a district of the city.

Administrative divisions 
Beimen is divided into Beimen, Yonglong, Yonghua, Yugang, Baoji, Tungbi, Kunjiang, Shuangchun, Jinhu, Cian, Sanguang, Zhongshu and Renli Villages.

Tourist attractions 
 Beimen Crystal Church
 Beimen Island Presbyterian Church
 Jingzaijiao Tile-paved Salt Fields
 Jishui River
 Taiwan Blackfoot Disease Socio-Medical Service Memorial House
 Nankunshen Temple
 Shuangchun Seashore Park
 Beimen Sports Park
 Luzhugou Fishing Harbor

Transportation 
Provincial Highway 84 connects the district to National freeway 1 and National Freeway 3. Provincial Highway 61 also runs through the district.

Notable natives 
 Wang King-ho, former physician
 Wu Mi-cha, Director of National Palace Museum

References 

Districts of Tainan